The Women's Basketball Development Association (WBDA) is a professional development female basketball league.

The season typically operates from late April until early August and concludes with a league championship hosted by one of the WBDAs member teams.

History 
The Women's Blue Chip Basketball League (WBCBL) was originally founded in November 2004 by Willie McCray Jr, with the assistance of co-founders Cortez Bond and Prentiss Broadway. The WBCBL provided former college players with top rate competition and exposure to professional scouts from around the world. The WBCBL also featured FIBA, former NWBL and WNBA players. The WBCBL was the first national women's development basketball league and the largest nationwide women's basketball league in North America, with a peak of 50 teams.

From 2004 to 2018, the WBCBL created hundreds of jobs across the North America and assisted in filling over 400 professional basketball jobs around the world.

In September 2018, WBCBL founder and president Willie McCray retired and handed off the day-to-day operations to William Kelly. The league was rebranded as the Women's Basketball Development Association (WBDA) and continues as a platform in professional development.

Teams

Former teams

 Arkansas Ballers
 Arkansas Starz
 Asheville Lady Panthers 
 Atlanta Battlecats
 Atlanta Diamond
 Atlanta Flames
 Atlanta J.C. Crew
 Atlanta Riverhawks
 Augusta Blaze
 Baltimore Cougars
 Beaufort Bison
 Brevard Flames
 C-Port Lady Hornets
 Calgary Storm
 Capital City Cougars
 Carolina Lady Rush
 Central VA All-Stars
 Charleston Lowcountry Fire
 Charlotte Heat
 Charlotte Invasion
 Chicago Lady Steam
 Cleveland Crush
 College Park Warriors
 Columbia Reign
 Columbus Hidden Gems
 Columbus Lady Warriors
 Conyers Rockets
 Conway Bearcats
 Dallas Angels
 Dallas Crest
Dallas Diesel
 Dallas Dolphins
 Dallas Sudden Impact
 DC Blue Stars
 DC Blue Streakz
 Delaware Lady Destroyers
 Delta Storm
 Detroit Black Hawks
 Detroit Dodgers
 Detroit Dolphins
 D.M.V. Bucks
 Douglasville Mustangs
 East Texas Drillers
 Elgin Rim Rockers
 Everett Elite
 EYG Plano Eagles
 Fayetteville Lady Rush
 Fayetteville Lady Xpress
 Flint Flames
 Flint Monarchs
 Florida Lady Knighthawks
 Fort Lauderdale Lions
 Georgia Soul
 Georgia Stampede
 Grand Rapids Galaxy
 Greenville Allstars
 Gulf Coast Storm
 Gulf Coast Tropics
 Gwinnett Starz
 Hudson Valley Queens
 Houston Jaguars
 Houston Sparks
 Huntsville Lady Hornets
 Illinois Shooting Stars
 Illinois Starlights
 Iowa Force
 Jacksonville Beach Panthers
 Jacksonville Cougars
 Jacksonville Reign
 Jacksonville Tigers
 Jersey Fusion
 Johnstown Super Stars
 Kansas City Majestics
 Kansas City Queens
 Kansas Nuggets
 Killeen Force
 Jonesboro Flames
 Las Vegas Gems
 Las Vegas Heat
 Lakewood Lady Panthers
 Lexington Lightning
 Long Island Wave
 Louisiana Bayou Angels
 Louisiana Blaze
 Louisiana All-Stars
 Louisville Fillies
 Maryland Queens
 Mass Marvels
 Memphis Express
 Memphis Hoopsters
 Memphis Lady Blazers
 Memphis Tigers
 M.I. Express
 Miami Rain
 Midwest Flyers
Minnesota Black Ice
 Mississippi Dream
 Mississippi Rockstars
 Mississippi Storm
 Missouri Arch Angels
 Montgomery Dream
 Music City Icons
 Native Dream
 Nebraska Strikers
 New Orleans Riders
 North Whitehall Lasers
 North Texas Flash
 NYC Exodus
 Oakland-Macomb Run
 Oakland Rise
 Ohio Dynasty
 Oklahoma Flash
 Oklahoma Heat
 Olympia Matrix
 Orange Park Crusaders
 Orlando Extreme
 Orlando Splash
 Orlando Stars
 Out West Elite
 Palm Beach Sabers
 Palm Beach Storm
 Phoenix Lady Elite 1's
 Phoenix Rockets
 Portland Energy
 RDU Sting
 Richmond Flames
 Riviera Beach Heatwave
 Rock County Robins
 San Antonio Crusaders
 San Diego Sol
 San Diego Sprint
 Savannah Warriors
 Seattle Express
 Shreveport Ballers
 Shreveport Sting
 Shreveport Sting
St. Louis Surge
 SoCal Splash
 South Carolina Legends
 South Carolina 
 Tacoma Stars
 Tallahassee Thunder
 Tampa Five Star
 Tampa X-Factor
 Tennessee Trapstars
 Texas Storm
 Toledo Threat
 Toronto Elite 1's
 Toronto Stealth
 Tucson Sol
 USA Elite
 Virginia Lady Stallions
 Virginia Lady Supreme
 Virginia Lady Warriors
 West Coast Lioness
 Winston-Salem Lady Warcats

Champions

WBCBL Professional Basketball Trailblazer Award
In honor of the Women's Blue Chip Basketball League's 10th anniversary, the 2015 Women's Professional Basketball "Trailblazer" Award was given on August 2, 2015, to ten female basketball icons, including Cynthia Cooper, Nancy Lieberman, Sarah Campbell, Dr. Robelyn Garcia, Lynette Woodard, Kandi Conda, Lisa Leslie, E.C. Hill, Dr. Geri Kay Hart and Tamika Catchings. The award recognizes some of the most influential people in professional women's basketball, specifically those who helped blaze the trail, shape the overall landscape and pave the way for women's professional basketball.

References

External links
Official WBDA website

Women's basketball leagues in the United States
Sports leagues established in 2004
2004 establishments in the United States